Dhund (released internationally as The Fog) is a 2003 Indian Hindi thriller-slasher film directed by Shyam Ramsay. The film stars Amar Upadhyay, Apurva Agnihotri, Aditi Govitrikar and Irrfan Khan in lead roles and released on 21 February 2003. The film is a remake of I Know What You Did Last Summer.

Plot
Simran lives in a wealthy Malhotra family with her uncle, Rajendra. She falls in love with Sameer, a photographer. While she participates in a beauty contest her college mate Taniya Khurana becomes frustrated. Taniya's brother, Ajit threatens her regularly. But Simran's best friend Kajal and Kajal's boyfriend Kunal support Simran. They assure her. Simran takes part in the contest and wins. Disheartened, Ajit attacks Simran and Kajal but they accidentally kill him after a short fight. When their respective boyfriends return, they decide not to tell anyone about the horrific incident. But Bikram, close to the Malhotra family tries to blackmail those four friends that he knows everything about Ajit's death. Police inspector Ashutosh Khanna suspects the gang of four but he has no evidence against them.

Cast
Amar Upadhyay as Sameer
Aditi Govitrikar as Simran Malhotra
Apurva Agnihotri as Kunal 
Divya Palat as Kajal 
Irrfan Khan as Ajit Khurana
Shweta Menon as Tanya Khurana
Prem Chopra as Rajendra Malhotra 
Gulshan Grover as Inspector Ashutosh Khanna
Mukesh Tiwari as Bikram
Tom Alter as Uncle Tom
Pappu Polyester

Soundtrack 
All tracks were composed by Viju Shah and lyrics penned by Ibrahim Ashq, Chandrashekhar Rajit and Rakesh Mishra.

References

External links 
 

2003 films
2000s Hindi-language films
Films scored by Viju Shah
Indian thriller films
Indian slasher films
Indian horror thriller films
2000s horror thriller films
Indian remakes of American films
Films directed by Shyam Ramsay